Eliana Assyrian/Akkadian, אֱלִיעָנָה (Hebrew), Ηλιάνα (Greek), إليانا (Arabic), is a female given name found with that spelling in Hebrew, Italian, Portuguese, and Spanish.

Origin & meaning
Many sources derive it from via Hebrew, from Akkadian/Assyrian, literally translated as "My God has answered me." It is composed of three Hebrew elements: EL, meaning GOD; ANA, meaning ANSWERED; and the Yud, located after EL, indicating first person possession. Biblical sources: "And he erected there an altar, and called it El- [God] elohe-Israel [El, the God of the Patriarch Israel]". "And Efron answered [anah] Abraham, saying unto him,".

It can also be derived from the Late Latin Aeliāna, the feminine form of the Latin family name Aeliānus (of the sun), which is derived from the Greek hēlios (sun).

Moreover, it is related to the Greek name Helene, and would thus be one of the many forms derived from that Greek name, such as Elaine from Old French.

Some variants include Iliana, Ileana, and Eleana.

In Arabic, it is translated as "the Bright" .

Popularity 
In the United States, Eliana first appeared on the charts in the 1990s, spurred by the momentum of popular names like Ella, and Anna. In recent years Eliana has become an even more popular name, ranking in the top 1,000 female names for the past sixteen years. Most recently, it ranked the 93rd most popular name used by females in the United States for 2016, according to the Social Security Administration, breaking into the top 100 most popular girls' names for the first time.

Popularity of the female name Eliana in the United States.

Note: Rank 1 is the most popular, rank 2 is the next most popular, and so forth. Name data are from Social Security card applications for births that occurred in the United States.

Notable people with the name 
Eliana Aleixo, Brazilian volleyball player
Eliana Alexander, Mexican actress
Eliana Benador, Swiss-American consultant
Eliana Michaelichen Bezerra, Brazilian actress
Eliana Bórmida, Argentine architect
Eliana Cardoso, Brazilian professor
Eliana Chávez, Colombian sprinter
Eliana Cuevas, Canadian musician
Eliana Falco, Uruguayan handball player
Eliana La Ferrara, Italian economist
Eliana Gaete, Chilean track and field athlete
Eliana Gil, Ecuadoran clinician
Eliana González, Peruvian table tennis player
Eliana Gropman, American ice dancer
Eliana Johnson, American journalist
Eliana Jones, Canadian actress
Eliana Krawczyk, Argentine naval officer
Eliana García Laguna, Mexican politician
Eliana Pintor Marin, American politician
Eliana Mason, American goalball player
Eliana Menassé, Mexican painter
Eliana Navarro, Chilean poet
Eliana Paco Paredes, Bolivian fashion designer
Eliana Pittman, Brazilian singer and actress
Eliana Printes, Brazilian singer and composer
Eliana Ramos, Uruguayan fashion model
Eliana Riggio, Italian UN official and author
Eliana Rubashkyn, Colombian-born New Zealander LGBTI activist
Eliana Stábile, Argentine footballer
Eliana Tomkins, British musician
Eliana Tranchesi, Brazilian entrepreneur

Other uses

Places 
 L'Eliana, a municipality in the province of Valencia, Spain

Ships 
 SS Santa Eliana, previously the SS Mayaguez

Media 

 Eliana, the romantic novel by Samuel Pordage;
 Eliana, Eliana, an Indonesian film directed by Riri Riza.

References

External links
 Think Baby Names

Spanish feminine given names
Portuguese feminine given names
Hebrew feminine given names
Italian feminine given names
Greek feminine given names
Latin feminine given names
Arabic feminine given names
Given names of Greek language origin
Swiss feminine given names